Pumpkin Center is an unincorporated community in Kern County, California.

Pumpkin Center is located at the intersection of Highways 99 and 119 (Taft Highway).  On both Interstate 5 and Highway 99, there is signage at the Highway 119 exit directing travelers to Pumpkin Center.

A post office opened in Pumpkin Center in 1945.

Pumpkin Center is the birthplace of Guy Madison (1922 – 1996), an American film, television, and radio actor.

References

Unincorporated communities in Kern County, California
Unincorporated communities in California

Census-designated places in Kern County, California
WikiProject Cities articles needing attention